Richard Louis Sharon (born April 15, 1950) is an American former professional baseball player.

Baseball career
Sharon was born in San Mateo, California, and is Jewish. He graduated from Sequoia High School, in Redwood City, California.

Sharon was a first round pick in the 1968 Major League Baseball draft, taken at #9 by the Pittsburgh Pirates. In 1970, he was 3rd in the Carolina League in RBIs, tied for third in home runs (22), 4th in runs (78), 6th in slugging percentage (.457), and tied for 7th in triples (5). He was traded from the Pirates to the Tigers for Norm McRae and Jim Foor at the Winter Meetings on November 27, 1972.

He broke into the major leagues at age 23 with the Detroit Tigers, on May 13, 1973. He was voted the team's Rookie of the Year.
In 1974, he earned a peak salary of $19,000 with the Tigers. He along with Ed Brinkman and Bob Strampe were dealt from the Tigers to the San Diego Padres for Nate Colbert in a three-team deal on November 18, 1974 that involved Brinkman also being sent to the St. Louis Cardinals for Sonny Siebert, Alan Foster and Rich Folkers. Danny Breeden went from the Padres to the Cardinals to subsequently complete the transactions. Sharon played his last professional game with the Padres on September 28, 1975, three weeks before he was traded to the Cardinals for Willie Davis on October 20.

References

External links

Dick Sharon sports profile provided by baseball-almanac.com
Dick Sharon biography provided by Kennedy Middle School

1950 births
Living people
Baseball players from California
Charleston Charlies players
Detroit Tigers players
Gastonia Pirates players
Gulf Coast Pirates players
Jewish American baseball players
Jewish Major League Baseball players
Major League Baseball left fielders
Major League Baseball right fielders
People from San Mateo, California
Rhode Island Red Sox players
Salem Rebels players
San Diego Padres players
Toledo Mud Hens players
Waterbury Pirates players
21st-century American Jews